Cruft is a Debian software package that finds cruft built up in a Linux computer system.

Overview
According to Debian's package list, "cruft is a program to look over your system for anything that shouldn't be there, but is; or for anything that should be there, but isn't." Among other things, the software inspects the packages listed in the dpkg database and other files that were created during the lifetime of software packages, but were not removed after their lifetime.

References

External links
Debian Package 'cruft' at the Debian wiki.

Unix software